Sadie Love is a lost 1919 American silent comedy film distributed by Paramount Pictures (as Famous Players-Lasky Corporation) and directed by John S. Robertson. It is based on a 1915 stage play of the same name by Avery Hopwood  and stars Billie Burke in the title role. In the play, Marjorie Rambeau played the Burke part.

Anecdote
Hedda Hopper reflecting back on the making of this film stated that Billie Burke always wanted a dressing room to herself and was reluctant to change clothing with the other female cast members. Hopper seemed to not understand (or perhaps was jealous) that Burke was the star of the film (as well as a star on Broadway) and was due the personal dressing room accorded a star.

Cast
Billie Burke - Sadie Love
James Crane - Count Luigi Pallavichi
Helen Montrose - Princess de Marabole
Hedda Hopper - Mrs. James Wakeley
Jed Prouty - James Wakeley
Shaw Lovett - Mumford Crewe
Mrs. Margaret A. Wiggin - Mrs. Warrington
May Rogers - Celeste
Charles Craig - Butler
Ida Waterman - Aunt Julia

References

External links
 
 
Lobby poster

1919 films
1919 comedy films
Silent American comedy films
American silent feature films
American black-and-white films
Famous Players-Lasky films
American films based on plays
Films directed by John S. Robertson
Paramount Pictures films
Lost American films
1919 lost films
Lost comedy films
1910s American films